Legendary Pictures has produced 53 feature films. In addition, the company is also in the process of producing an additional five films and is developing various other projects. Of the 53 feature films produced, 48 have had theatrical releases, one has had a direct-to-video release, and four have had video on demand releases. Note that in most cases the distributor or distributors also co-produced the film. The box office column reflects the worldwide gross for the theatrical release of the film in United States dollars, not adjusted for inflation.

Films

Upcoming films

References 

Legendary
L